Sheldon Gilgore (February 13, 1932 – February 12, 2010) was an American physician and executive who served as president of Pfizer and CEO of G.D. Searle. He also served as chairman of the board of Clark University and was a member of the founding family of the Connecticut Grand Opera.

Gilgore was trained as an endocrinologist. Gilgore retired from Searle in 1995.

References

 Sheldon Gilgore, Physician Who Led Drug Giants Pfizer and Searle, Dies at 77, By Duff Wilson, March 1, 2010, on The New York Times Company

1932 births
2010 deaths
American endocrinologists
American health care chief executives